Zanclorhynchus spinifer, also known as the Antarctic horsefish or spiny horsefish, is a species of marine ray-finned fish belonging to the family Congiopodidae, the horsefishes or pigfishes. This species grows to a length of  TL and is of minor importance to the commercial fishery industry.

Taxonomy
Zanclorhynchus spinifer was first formally described in 1880 by the German-born British ichthyologist Albert Günther With the type locality given as Kerguelen Island. Günther classified the newly described species in a new monotypic genus, Zanclorhynchus, which remained monotypic until Chereshnev's horsefish (Z. chereshnevi) was described in 2016.

Subspecies
Zanclorhynchus spinifer has a number of subspecies proposed, these are:

 Zanclorhynchus spinifer armatus Zhukov, 2019 Prince Edward Islands, Crozet Islands
 Zanclorhynchus spinifer heracleus Zhukov & Balushkin, 2018 Hercules Ridge, Central (Umanova) Bank
 Zanclorhynchus spinifer macquariensis Zhukov, 2019 Macquarie Island 
 Zanclorhynchus spinifer spinifer Günther, 1880 Kerguelen Island, Heard Island

Etymology
The specific name spinifer means “bearing spines” referring to the bones of the head having spines on them.

Description
Zanclorhynchus spinifer has between 7 and 10 spines in the first dorsal fin and 12-15 soft rays in the second dorsal fin, the dorsal fin is divided by a deep incision. The anal fin has 10 or 11 soft rays but no spines. There are rows of minute teeth in the jaws. The snout has a spine over each nostril, there are obvious spine at the rear of the bone over the eye, under the eye and to the rear of the eye. There is a highly elongated spine above the operculum. The operculum has three low, radiating ridges ending in spines and there is a further spine on the body at the base of the pectoral fins. There are scattered scales on the upper body and flanks but none on the lower areas. The overall colour is brownish, purple or ochre with small black spots. A black bar runs from the second dorsal fin to the anal fin with another on the front part of the caudal fin. There is a black spot at the base of the first two dorsal fin spines with a black bar extending from the rear of the first dorsal fin down onto the lower body. The fins are yellow with black bars in the centres of the caudal, pectoral and pelvic fins.

Distribution and habitat
Zanclorhynchus spiniferis found in the Southern Ocean in the Indian and Pacific sectors. It has been recorded in Australia n territory at Macquarie Island, in the  French Southern Territories at Crozet, Kerguelen Heard and McDonald Islands; and from the South African Marion and Prince Edward Islands. They are also found on seamounts such as the Hercules Rudge and Kara-Dag Seamount.

Biology
Zanclorhynchus spinifer spends most of the time on the seabed where it hunts for benthic invertebrates, particularly amphipods and it has been recorded from beds of kelp. They have been recorded as prey in the diet of Hooker’s sea lions (Phocarctos hookeri) at Macquarie Island.

Fisheries
Zanclorhynchus spinifer is abundant,  and is caught as bycatch by trawlers. The flesh is not normally marketed for food but it is converted to fish meal.

References

Congiopodidae
Fish described in 1880
Taxa named by Albert Günther